Ferozeshah may refer to:

 Ferozeshah Kotla, a stadium in Delhi
 Ferozshah Tughluq, a sultan of Delhi
 A village in Punjab (India), notable for the Battle of Ferozeshah

See also 
 Pherozeshah Mehta Gardens